Telmatherina obscura is a species of fish in the subfamily Telmatherininae part of the family Melanotaeniidae, the rainbowfishes. It is endemic to Indonesia. The species was described in 1991 by Maurice Kottelat with a type locality of Mengonuwai on Lake Matano on the island of Sulawesi.

Sources

obscura
Taxa named by Maurice Kottelat
Taxonomy articles created by Polbot
Fish described in 1991